Steele County is the name of two counties in the United States:

Steele County, Minnesota
Steele County, North Dakota